IPRC-Kigali BBC is a Rwandan basketball club based in the Kicukiro district of Kigali. The team plays in the National Basketball League, the highest national level. It is the basketball team of the IPRC Kigali Polytechnic University. Several Rwandan national team players, such as Dieudonné Ndizeye, have played for the team.

Honours
Rwandan Heroes Cup
Winner (1): 2017

Notable players

 Dieudonné Ndizeye (2 seasons: 2015–17)
 Guibert Nijimbere (2 seasons: 2017–19)

Season by season

References

External links
Official Instagram
Afrobasket team profile

Basketball teams in Rwanda